Acyl-CoA synthetase short-chain family member 3 is a protein that in humans is encoded by the ACSS3 gene.

Function 

ACSS3 is part of a family known as Acyl-coenzyme A synthetases (ACSs), which catalyze the initial reaction in fatty acid metabolism. This reaction activates fatty acids via thioesterification to CoA, thereby allowing their participation in both anabolic and catabolic pathways. The existence of many ACSs suggests that each plays a unique role, directing the acyl-CoA product to a specific metabolic fate. Knowing the full complement of ACS genes in the human genome will facilitate future studies to characterize their specific biological functions.

References

Further reading 

 
 

EC 6.2.1